Mannophorus is a genus of beetles in the family Cerambycidae, containing the following species:

 Mannophorus forreri Bates, 1885
 Mannophorus laetus LeConte, 1854

References

Trachyderini
Cerambycidae genera